The 2018 Nordic Under-17 Football Championship was the 42nd edition of the Nordic Under-17 Football Championship. It was held in Faroe Islands from 5 to 11 August 2018.

Participants

Venues

Group stage

Group A

Group B

Knockout stage

Seventh place playoff

Fifth place playoff

Third place playoff

Final

References

2018 in youth association football